The Young Skyheater is an American aircraft that was designed by Ed Young for homebuilt construction.

Design and development
The Skyheater is a two-seat, single engine, conventional landing gear-equipped, parasol wing aircraft. Rather than a separate distinct vertical tail section, the Skyheater fuselage is tapered only along its sides, leaving a square tail or full-height dorsal fin extending to the wing root. The fuselage is constructed of welded steel tubing with fabric covered control surfaces. The wings are of all aluminum construction.

Specifications (Young Skyheater)

See also

References

Homebuilt aircraft